Aishmuquam is a municipal committee city in district of Anantnag, Jammu and Kashmir. The Aishmuqam shrine is located in Aishmuquam.

Geography

Aishmuqam Shrine 
The shrine is considered as one of the most visited and prominent shrines in Kashmir. It was constructed in the honour of Shiekh Zain-ud-din, who was one among chief disciples of Nund Rishi.  It is considered sacred by many people from different religions. Zain-ud-din spent most of his time preaching about Allah. For this purpose he decided to always restrict himself to this cave. The shrine is thronged by thousands of devotees during the annual Urs and Zool festival.

Demographics 
 India census, Aishmuquam had a population of 6,519.

References

Cities and towns in Jammu district